Einar Hovdhaugen (26 February 1908 – 1 July 1996) was a Norwegian politician for the Centre Party.

He was born in Ringebu.

He was elected to the Norwegian Parliament from Oppland in 1958, and was re-elected on two occasions. He had previously served as a deputy representative in the periods 1945–1949 and 1954–1957. Hovdhaugen was a member of Ringebu municipality council in the periods 1945–1947 and 1951–1955.

He was the father of the linguist Even Hovdhaugen.

References

1908 births
1996 deaths
People from Ringebu
Members of the Storting
Centre Party (Norway) politicians
20th-century Norwegian politicians